US Post Office—Fredonia is a historic post office building located at Fredonia in Chautauqua County, New York, and within the boundaries of the Fredonia Commons Historic District. It was designed and built in 1935–36 as a Works Progress Administration project, and is one of a number of post offices in New York State designed by the Office of the Supervising Architect of the Treasury Department, Louis A. Simon. It is a one-story, five bay brick structure set on a brick foundation in the Colonial Revival style.  The central section features three large round arched openings with cast-stone keystones.  The interior features "The Harvest"; a mural from 1937 by artist Arnold Blanch.

It was listed on the National Register of Historic Places in 1989.

References

External links

Fredonia
Government buildings completed in 1935
Colonial Revival architecture in New York (state)
Works Progress Administration in New York (state)
Buildings and structures in Chautauqua County, New York
National Register of Historic Places in Chautauqua County, New York